Convergence may refer to:

Arts and media

Literature
Convergence (book series), edited by Ruth Nanda Anshen
"Convergence" (comics), two separate story lines published by DC Comics:
A four-part crossover storyline that united the four Weirdoverse titles in 1997
A 2015 crossover storyline spanning the DC Comics Multiverse
Convergence (journal), an academic journal that covers the fields of communications and media
Convergence (novel), by Charles Sheffield
Convergence (Cherryh novel), by C. J. Cherryh

Music
Convergence (Front Line Assembly album), 1988
Convergence (David Arkenstone and David Lanz album), 1996
Convergence (Dave Douglas album), 1999
Convergence (Warren Wolf album), 2016

Other media
Convergence (2015 film), an American horror-thriller film
Convergence (2019 film), a British drama film
Convergence, a 2021 Netflix film by Orlando von Einsiedel
Convergence (Pollock), a 1952 oil painting by Jackson Pollock

Events
CONvergence, a speculative fiction convention in Minnesota
Convergence (ABC convention), an annual gathering of gay men of size and their admirers in North America
Convergence (goth festival), the annual net.goth party

Organizations
Convergence (Guatemala), a political party in Guatemala
Convergence (Mexico), a political party in Mexico

Science, technology, and mathematics

Biology and ecology
Convergence (eye), simultaneous inward movement of eyes toward each other
Convergence (sustainability science), progress towards equity within biological planetary limits in sustainability science
Convergent evolution, the acquisition of the same biological trait in unrelated lineages

Computing
Convergence (evolutionary computing), a means of modeling the tendency for genetic characteristics of populations to stabilize over time
Convergence (routing), the status of a set of routers having the same knowledge of the surrounding network topology
Convergence (SSL), a distributed replacement for the CA system used by Secure Sockets Layer

Mathematics
Convergence space, a generalization of the notion of convergence that is found in point-set topology. 
Convergence (logic), the property that different transformations of the same state have a transformation to the same end state
Convergent series, the process of some functions and sequences approaching a limit under certain conditions
More generally, the process of a sequence or other function converging to a limit in a metric space. (See: Cauchy sequence; Limit of a sequence; Limit of a function.)
Pointwise convergence
Unconditional convergence
Uniform convergence
Other modes of convergence (annotated index)
Convergence of random variables, different forms of stochastic convergence
Convergence of measures
A property of dynamical systems studied in stability theory

Other uses in science and technology
Convergence (economics), a possible phenomenon also known as the Catch-up effect
Language convergence, the tendency of languages whose speaker communities overlap significantly to influence each other and become more similar as a result
Technological convergence, the tendency for different technological systems to evolve toward performing similar tasks
Convergence of evidence, or consilience, the principle that evidence from independent sources can "converge" to strong conclusions
Convergent boundary, the movement of two tectonic plates coming closer
Convergence zone, a region in the atmosphere where two prevailing flows meet and interact
Convergence zones of sonars; see Sonar
Gun harmonisation, also called multiple gun convergence
Convergence (optics), the angle formed between focused rays of light

Other uses
Convergence (accounting), the goal of a single set of accounting standards to be used internationally
Convergence (relationship), the tendency of people to become more alike as a relationship progresses
Convergence Movement, a movement within Christianity
Convergence objective of the Structural Funds and Cohesion Fund (‘convergence funding’), part of the regional policy of the European Union from 2007 to 2013

See also
Converge (disambiguation)
Convergent (disambiguation)
Divergence (disambiguation)
Transmedia storytelling